The Indio Formation is a geologic formation of the Wilcox Group in Mexico. The sandstones, shales, conglomerates and claystones preserve fossils dating back to the Ypresian age (Wasatchian to Bridgerian in the NALMA classification) of the Eocene epoch of the Paleogene period.

See also 
 List of fossiliferous stratigraphic units in Mexico
 Klondike Mountain Formation
 Nanjemoy Formation
 Lechería Limestone

References 

Geologic formations of Mexico
Paleogene Mexico
Eocene Series of North America
Ypresian Stage
Bridgerian
Wasatchian
Sandstone formations
Shale formations
Conglomerate formations
Shallow marine deposits
Formations
Formations